Alan Weyl Bernheimer Sr. (December 9, 1913, Philadelphia – January 3, 2006, New York City) was an American microbiologist, known as a pioneer of modern bacterial toxinology.

Biography
Bernheimer graduated with a B.S. in 1935 and an A.M. in 1937 from Temple University, where he worked as an assistant in biology from 1935 to 1937. In 1942, he received his Ph.D. in medical sciences from the University of Pennsylvania. His Ph.D. thesis is entitled Studies on the antigenic specificity of Paramecium and studies on the massive cultivation of Streptococcus pyogenes. From 1937 to 1938 he was an instructor in bacteriology at Pennsylvania State College of Optometry (now called Salus University). In the department of microbiology of (what is now called) the New York University Grossman School of Medicine, he was an instructor from 1941 to 1945, an assistant professor from 1945 to 1952, an associate professor from 1952 to 1958, and a full professor from 1958 to 1984, when he retired as professor emeritus. At the NYU medical school, he was the chair of Basic Medical Sciences from 1969 to 1974. From 1957 to 1960, Bernheimer served as a consultant to the Office of the Surgeon General of the United States. From 1963 to 1968, he was a trustee of the Cold Spring Harbor Laboratory. He was often a summer investigator at the Marine Biological Laboratory in Woods Hole, Massachusetts.

During WW II, Bernheimer contributed to the development of a vaccine against gas gangrene. Throughout his career, he was dedicated to laboratory work. He and his co-workers compared toxins produced by a wide variety of organisms. He did research on venoms from insects, spiders, snakes, sea jellies, and sea anemones, and how such venoms sometimes have biochemical and serological mechanisms similar to those of bacteria that produce toxins. In 1985 Bernheimer and two colleagues published their discovery that toxic phospholipases D are present in the venom of the brown recluse spider (Loxosceles reclusa) and in cultures of Corynebacterium pseudotuberculosis. The two enzyme toxins have different evolutionary origins but are similar in molecular weight, charge, substrate specificity, and in several biological activities. Bernheimer was the author or co-author of more than 150 scientific papers and the editor of several books.

Bernheimer received in 1948 the Eli Lilly and Company-Elanco Research Award. He was elected in 1951 a fellow of the American Association for the Advancement of Science. In April 1976 he gave the inaugural Stuart Mudd Lecture of the Eastern Pennsylvania Branch of the American Society for Microbiology.

In March 1942 he married Harriet Poller (1919–2009), who became a professor of medicine at SUNY Downstate Medical Center. They had a son, Alan Weyl Bernheimer Jr., known as the poet Alan Bernheimer.

Selected publications

Articles

Books

References

External links
  (photo)

1913 births
2006 deaths
Temple University alumni
University of Pennsylvania alumni
New York University Grossman School of Medicine faculty
American bacteriologists
American toxicologists
Fellows of the American Association for the Advancement of Science
20th-century American biologists
Scientists from Philadelphia